SRSS may refer to:

Education
Shaaban Robert Secondary School, Dar es Salaam, Tanzania
School for Regulatory Studies and Supervision, part of the National Institute of Securities Markets, India
Steinbach Regional Secondary School, Steinbach, Manitoba, Canada
School on Radiological Safety Studies, a school at the Global Centre for Nuclear Energy Partnership

Science and technology
 Square root of the sum of the squares
Sun Ray Server Software

Public administration
 Structural Reform Support Service, a department of the European Commission which supports reform efforts in the 28 EU countries

Military
Swing Role Surveillance System, another name for GlobalEye
98th Southern Range Support Squadron